Lahaska Creek (Lackawissa or Lahaskeekee) is a tributary of Mill Creek in Wrightstown Township, Bucks County, Pennsylvania. The Geographic Name Information System I.D. is 1178763, U.S. Department of the Interior Geological Survey I.D. is 02632.

History
The area was originally inhabited by the Lenape native americans as Lackawissa or Lahaskeekee, "the place of much writing". In 1718, Richard Mitchell purchased  and built a mill. It was replaced later by another mill known as Rush Valley Mills. After Mitchell, it was owned by Eldad Roberts, then by Joseph Watson.

Course
Lahaska Creek rises near the southwest border of Solebury Township from an unnamed pond north of the village of Lahaska.

Geology

Atlantic Plain
Piedmont Province
Stockton conglomerate
Stockton Formation
Beekmantown Group
Allentown Formation
The headwaters of Lahaska Creek begins in the Stockton conglomerate from the Triassic consisting of conglomerate and conglomeratic sandstone. Mineralogy is mostly quartz.

It quickly moves into the Stockton Formation also from the Triassic, which consists of sandstone, arkosic sandstone, shale, siltstone, and mudstone.

It then very briefly flows through a small portion of the Beekmantown Group, from the Ordovician, a layer of limestone containing dolomite, and chert.

Then it spends most of its time in the Allentown Formation, from the Cambrian. The Allentown consists of dolomite and impure limestone, siltstone containing calcium carbonate, oolites, stromatolites, and sharpstone.

Municipalities
Solebury Township
Buckingham Township

Crossings and Bridges
Pennsylvania Route 413 (Durham Road)
Quarry Road
Holicong Road (local route 391)
Carousel Lane
Hickory Hollow Lane
Street Road

See also
List of rivers of Pennsylvania
List of rivers of the United States
List of Delaware River tributaries

References

Rivers of Pennsylvania
Rivers of Bucks County, Pennsylvania
Tributaries of the Neshaminy Creek